16 Most Requested Songs may refer to:

 16 Most Requested Songs (Bobby Vinton album), 1991
 16 Most Requested Songs (Jo Stafford album), 1995
 16 Most Requested Songs (Johnny Mathis album), 1986